Jamsetjee Bomanjee Wadia ( 1754–1821)| was an Indian Shipbuider and member of the Wadia family.

References

Footnotes

Sources

Further reading
 

1754 births
1821 deaths
Indian shipbuilders
Parsi people
Wadia family